Paravoor Thazhathuveettil Krishnan Kartha Narayana Pillai (25 March 1890 – 23 June 1971) was an Indian freedom fighter during the British Raj in India and was a member of the Indian National Congress (INC) which fought against the British rule in India. He was the last Prime Minister of Travancore and the first Chief Minister of Travancore-Cochin at the time of its formation in 1949. He was commonly known as Parur TK.

Early life 
Paravoor TK was born in North Paroor, Travancore, British India, as the son of Thazhathuveettil Madhavi Amma and Cheranalloor Krishnan Kartha. He was educated at the Union Christian College in Alwaye, and earned his Bachelor of Arts degree in 1911.

Political career

Early career 
In 1924, Paravoor TK became the thaluk president of the Indian National Congress (INC), North Parur unit. He went on to become the Travancore-Cochin secretary of the INC in 1932, and its president in 1938. He was a founding member of the Travancore State Congress. In 1939, Paravoor TK was arrested along with several other leaders for their allegations against the Diwan of Travancore C. P. Ramaswami Iyer, and was held until they withdrew the allegations. In 1948, Paravoor TK became the president of the Aikya Thiruvithamcore-Cochin Grandhasala Sanghom, a group that promoted public libraries in Travancore and Cochin.

As Premier 
On 22 October 1948, Parur TK became the second and last Prime Minister of Travancore. His government took large-scale measures to suppress the communist movement that was gaining strength in the state and organising riots against feudal lords. The next year, he became the first Chief Minister of Travancore-Cochin, after the new state was created by merging the princely states of Cochin and Travancore. His successes in the state of Travancore-Cochin is attributed to a lot of men who were his staunch supporters, among them his personal secretary, the famous freedom fighter from Karikkakom in Thiruvananthapuram, Karikkakom S. Narayana Pillai. He was unanimously elected the leader of the Congress Legislature Party and he assumed charge as the Chief Minister from 1 July 1949.

In 1951, Annie Mascarene, the former Minister for Health and Power who had resigned in January 1950, accused Minister for Public Works E. John Philipose of corruption. Parur TK stood by Philipose, but Panampilly Govinda Menon, education minister, insisted that Philipose resign. In this circumstance, Parur TK forwarded the resignation of the entire cabinet to Rajpramukh Chithira Thirunal Balarama Varma on 24 February 1951. Philipose later filed a defamation suit against Mascarene at the high court; this was transferred to Madras High Court at Mascarene's request, where Philipose was cleared of scandal and Mascarene was found guilty and ordered to pay compensation to Philipose.

Later career 
Paravoor TK became the Minister for Food, Labour and Education during the next ministry which was headed by C. Kesavan.

Paravoor TK retired from politics and devoted his time to writing. He was bed ridden for a few years with arthritis until his death.

Legacy 
The playback singer Sujatha Mohan and late Radhika Thilak are his grand daughters and another playback singer Swetha Mohan is his great-granddaughter.

References

1971 deaths
People from Aluva
People of the Kingdom of Travancore
University of Madras alumni
20th-century Indian lawyers
Indian independence activists from Kerala
Indian National Congress politicians from Kerala
Malayali politicians
Chief Ministers of Kerala
Chief ministers from Indian National Congress
1890 births
Members of the Travancore–Cochin Legislative Assembly